Kew College Prep is a non-denominational mixed preparatory school in Kew in the London Borough of Richmond upon Thames. Despite its name, Kew College Prep is a primary school for children aged 3 to 11.

History
Kew College Prep began in 1927 as a small school located in a room above a shop in Kew. As the number of pupils grew, the school moved to a large Victorian house in Cumberland Road. In 1953 the school expanded into a second house in Cumberland Road. It became a charitable trust in 1985.

Present day
Kew College Prep averages 292 pupils between the ages of 3 and 11. As of June 2010, the school scores 69.2% for general parental satisfaction at the Independent School Reviews site, with its highest rating being for academic standards (76.5% satisfaction) and its lowest for sporting quality (63.2%).

References

External links
 Kew College Prep
 Profile on the Independent Schools Council website
 Schools in and around Chiswick
 Independent School Reviews

1927 establishments in England
Private co-educational schools in London
Private schools in the London Borough of Richmond upon Thames
Kew, London
Preparatory schools in London